Kurigalu Saar Kurigalu is a 2001 Indian Kannada-language comedy film directed and written by Rajendra Singh Babu. The film stars Ramesh Aravind, S. Narayan, Mohan, Bhavana, Ruchita Prasad and Ananth Nag in the lead roles. This is the first film in the "Saar" series directed by Babu and was released on 23 March 2001 and received generally positive reviews from the critics and turned out to be box-office hit.

The film won the Karnataka State Film Award for Best Film and also Karnataka State Film Award for Best Supporting Actress to Umashree for the year 2001. The film's title is based on a famous poem on herd mentality written by acclaimed poet K. S. Nissar Ahmed.

Plot
Rummi (Ramesh Aravind), Nani (S. Narayan) and Moni (Mohan Shankar) are three inmates who wants to remain in jail permanently as they do not want to witness outside world. A kind hearted inspector (Srinivasa Murthy) gets them released as he finds goodness in them and wants them to lead a good life. All the three get a home thanks to an auto driver (Sundar Raj) with a condition that one of them marries his middle aged elder sister (Umashree) who is unmarried. Umashree falls in love with Nani assuming him to be Lord Krishna. However he escapes from the forced marriage. All the three ends up falling in love with different girls. Due to a mix up they end receiving a bag of money intended for other robbers. All the three witness Srinivasa Murthy's daughter and her lover (Harish Raj) committing suicide and after saving them, they come to know that Srinivasa Murthy is ill and she is forced by her uncle (Doddanna) to marry his immatured son (Komal Kumar) to take over her property. In the end, trio with the help of their lovers (two of them being undercover police) and an inspector (Anant Nag) teach them a lesson, gets them arrested and they get married in the end.

Cast
Ramesh Aravind as Rammi
S. Narayan as Nani and Nani's father
Mohan as Moni
Ananth Nag as Special Investigation Officer
Bhavana as Ramya
Ruchita Prasad as Dr Vijayalakshmi
Bhavyasree Rai
NGEF Ramamurthy as lawyer 
Umashree as Rukmini
Srinivasa Murthy as Jail Warden Neelakanthappa
Doddanna as Veerappa
Komal Kumar as Ice Candy Gopala
Vinayak Joshi as Bhavana's brother
Harish Raj as Rajesh
Sundar Raj as Sundar, Rukmini's Brother
Mandeep Roy as Tailor Seethapathi
Honnavalli krishna as Sampangi 
Bank suresh 
Danny 
Ravi varma 
Joe Simon 
Mari mutthu 
Hulivana Gangadharayya 
Shankar bhat 
Tharakesh patel

Soundtrack

References

External links
Songs at Raaga

2001 films
2000s Kannada-language films
Films set in Bangalore
Films scored by Hamsalekha
Indian comedy films
Indian film series
Films shot in Bangalore
Films directed by Rajendra Singh Babu